Wild Man Blues is a 1997 documentary film directed by Barbara Kopple, about the musical avocation of actor/director/comic Woody Allen. The film takes its name from a jazz composition, sometimes attributed to Jelly Roll Morton and sometimes to Louis Armstrong, and recorded (among others) by each of them. Wild Man Blues is rated PG (Parental guidance suggested) because the film includes several profanities.

Theme
The film depicts Allen's love of early 20th century New Orleans music by preserving performances on the 1996 tour in Europe by his New Orleans Jazz Band. Allen has played clarinet with this band for over 25 years.

Musicians
 Dan Barrett, on trombone
 Simon Wettenhall, on trumpet
 John Gill, on drums and vocals
 Greg Cohen, on bass
 Cynthia Sayer, on piano
 Eddy Davis, band director, and on banjo
 Allen, on clarinet

Although their European tour is the primary focus, the film was also notable as the first major public showcase for Allen's relationship with Soon-Yi Previn.

Formats published
Since the deletion of its original, contemporaneous VHS releases, the film has had only an afterlife on DVD. In April 2012 the film was featured as a bonus disc on an Australian box set of Allen's films, and similarly appeared as an extra in a UK Region 2 box set in July 2014. Although the film is not available as a standalone DVD in any of the main English-speaking countries, it has been released singly in various Region 2 pressings around Europe, with relevant (optional) subtitles.
 The film soundtrack was released on RCA Compact Disc and later digitally

Reception
On review aggregator Rotten Tomatoes, the film holds an 86% approval rating based on 37 reviews. Roger Ebert stated "[Kopple] might seem an unlikely choice for this material, but no doubt her track record gained Allen's trust." Maitland McDonagh of TV Guide commented "Die-hard Woody Allen fans will be grateful for even these small glimpses of their idol at his most unguarded, but the less-devoted would be better off renting ANNIE HALL." Janet Maslin of The New York Times wrote 'In her unexpectedly delightful documentary about Woody Allen as jazz musician, Barbara Kopple demonstrates cinema verite at its most seductive. Her Wild Man Blues invites its audience to take a grand tour of Europe, listen to jauntily exhilarating music and regard Mr. Allen in a colorful new light." Keith Phipps of The A.V. Club stated "...Wild Man Blues nicely conveys a sense of its subject's dedication to his craft...  Those interested in Allen simply because he's Allen will want to see Wild Man Blues, but in the end, Kopple has been given a couple of interesting subjects (New Orleans jazz in its current state and Woody Allen), and her film fails to get at the heart of either."

References

External links

1997 films
Documentary films about music and musicians
Films directed by Barbara Kopple
American documentary films
1990s English-language films
Woody Allen
Films produced by Jean Doumanian
1990s American films